Sportelli is a surname of Italian origin. It includes the following notable individuals:

Cesare Sportelli (1702–1750), Italian lawyer and Catholic priest
Franco Sportelli, Italian actor 
Luca Sportelli (1927–1999), Italian actor
Paul Sportelli, vocalist in the band Eye of the Storm

See also
Ortelli
Portelli
Sportellidae